LTBA may refer to:

Linguistics of the Tibeto-Burman Area, an academic journal
Istanbul Atatürk Airport (ICAO airport code: LTBA)